Sweet Grass (also Sweetgrass) is a census-designated place and unincorporated community in Toole County, Montana, United States, on the Canada–US border. It is the northern terminus of Interstate 15, an important route connecting western Canada, the western United States, and Mexico. The population was 65 according to the 2020 census.

In 2004, a joint border facility opened at the Sweetgrass port of entry and Coutts, Alberta, housing both Canadian and American federal authorities. At  in elevation, it is one of the higher border crossings.

Fire service is provided through the volunteer fire department in Coutts.

Demographics

Climate
Sweet Grass has a semi-arid climate (Köppen BSk) that closely borders a humid continental climate (Köppen Dwb).

Notable people
 Earl W. Bascom (1906-1995), "Father of Modern Rodeo" and Hall of Fame Cowboy, artist, sculptor, actor, inventor, cowboyed in the 1920s on a ranch on Kicking Horse Creek once owned by his cousin C.M. Russell
 Charles M. Russell (1864-1926), cowboy artist and sculptor ranched on Kicking Horse Creek near the Sweetgrass Hills

In popular culture
 The town is referenced in the Marias Pass Approach/Route for TRS2006, via two portals on a BNSF Railway line that goes up to Sweet Grass.
Referenced to in "Alberta Bound" by Paul Brandt. ("... and so I cranked up the radio cause there’s just a little more to go for I’d cross the border at that Sweet Grass sign.")

Notes

Census-designated places in Montana
Census-designated places in Toole County, Montana
Unincorporated communities in Montana
Unincorporated communities in Toole County, Montana